Labbe or Labbé may refer to:

People
 Arnaud Labbe, a French professional racing cyclist
 Carlos Labbé, a Chilean writer
 Carlos Labbé Márquez (1876–1941), a Chilean bishop
 Charles Labbé (1851–1889), a French doctor
 François Labbé, a Canadian mass media businessman; son of Tancrède Labbé
 Jean-François Labbé, a Canadian professional ice-hockey player
 Léon Labbé (1832–1916), a French doctor and politician
 Martine Labbé (born 1958), Belgian operations researcher
 Matthieu Labbé, a French football player
 Philippe Labbe (1607–1667), a French Jesuit writer
 Pierre-Luc Labbé, a Canadian football player
 Slugger Labbe, a crew chief on the American NASCAR racing circuit
 Stephanie Labbé, a Canadian soccer player
 Tancrède Labbé (1887–1956), a Canadian politician and businessman; father of François Labbé

Places
 Labbé Point, a point of land projecting into Discovery Bay, Antarctica
 Labbé Rock, a landmark lying off the coast of Largo Island, near the Antarctic Peninsula